Charles MacFetridge   was Archdeacon of Ross, Ireland from 1904 until 1925.

He was educated at Trinity College, Dublin and ordained in 1870. After  curacies in Cork and Kinsale, he was the incumbent at Kilgarriff, County Cork from 1874 to 1925.

References

Alumni of Trinity College Dublin
19th-century Irish Anglican priests
20th-century Irish Anglican priests